The women's synchronized 10 metre platform competition of the diving events at the 2015 Pan American Games will be held on July 13 at the CIBC Pan Am/Parapan Am Aquatics Centre and Field House in Toronto, Canada. The winner of the competition will qualify her country a quota place for the 2016 Summer Olympics in Rio de Janeiro, Brazil. If the host nation of the Olympics wins the event, the runner up will qualify instead.

The synchronized diving competitions all consist of one round. All teams compete in a single round of six dives.

Seven judges evaluate each dive, giving the diver a score between 0 and 10 with increments of 0.5; scores below 7.0 or above 9.5 are rare. The two highest and two lowest scores from each judge are dropped. The remaining three scores are summed, and multiplied by the degree of difficulty of the dive to give the total score for the dive. Scores from each dive in the round are summed to give the round score.

Schedule

Results

Detailed Results

References 

Diving at the 2015 Pan American Games